Bazus-Aure is a commune in the Hautes-Pyrénées department in southwestern France.

Geography

Climate

Bazus-Aure has an oceanic climate (Köppen climate classification Cfb).

Population

See also
Communes of the Hautes-Pyrénées department

References

Communes of Hautes-Pyrénées